Mohammad Ismael Kwid (born 9 April 1956), also known as Abu Shakir, is a Syrian football manager and former player, who is the current manager of Emirati club Al Dhafra. He is considered one of the greatest managers in Syria, having led Al-Karamah to various league titles and the Asian Champions League Final. Kwid has also created a youth academy in Homs with Mootaz Mando.

Managerial career
Kwid began his managerial career in 1989 with Maysalon Damascus. Kwid took charge of the Lebanon national team for a short period, between 19 and 28 November 2003. On 14 July 2004, he was recalled as manager of Lebanon, staying in charge until 2005.

In 2011, Kwid took charge of Wehdat, before becoming manager of Zakho FC in 2012. After two years, Kwid became the coach of Al-Dhafra.

Honours

Manager 
Individual
 Lebanese Premier League Best Coach: 2002–03, 2003–04

References

1956 births
Living people
Al-Karamah players
Syrian football managers
Lebanon national football team managers
Syria national football team managers
Expatriate football managers in Lebanon
Syrian expatriate sportspeople in Lebanon
Sportspeople from Homs
Al Dhafra FC managers
Syrian expatriate football managers
Expatriate football managers in the United Arab Emirates
Expatriate football managers in Jordan
Expatriate football managers in Iraq
Syrian footballers
UAE Pro League managers
Association footballers not categorized by position